Todd Ames Hunter (born August 26, 1953) is an American politician and lawyer from Corpus Christi, Texas, serving as a Republican member of the Texas House of Representatives from District 32 in Nueces County. From 1993 to 1997, as a Democrat, Hunter also held the District 32 House seat. He did not seek reelection in 1996. From 1989 to 1993, he was the District 36 Democratic representative. In the 1992 election, he was switched after two terms to District 32 via redistricting.

Hunter is a candidate for his eighth nonconsecutive term in the general election scheduled for November 4, 2014.

Early life and education

Hunter was born in Bartlesville in northeastern Oklahoma to Richard and Patricia London Hunter. In 1975, he graduated from the University of Kansas at Topeka, Kansas, with a Bachelor of Arts degree in Political Science, Speech, and Human Relations. In 1978, he obtained his Juris Doctor degree from the Dedman School of Law at Southern Methodist University.

Career 
In 1978, Hunter moved to Corpus Christi, where he is currently a solo practitioner after leaving civil defense law in 2017 as a partner with Hunter, Barker & Fancher, LLP. He has worked for numerous law firms in Corpus Christi.

He is married to the former Alexis Taylor, the eldest daughter of Marcella and Leroy Taylor. Alexis and Todd reared all three of their children—Todd A. Hunter, Jr. (born 1986), Michael Taylor Hunter (born 1987), and Christina Alyson Hunter (born 1991)--in Corpus Christi.

Hunter is a member of All Saints Episcopal Church in Corpus Christi. He is a director and member of the advisory board of the Coastal Bend division of the Boy Scouts of America. He is affiliated with Rotary International and is a board member of Consumer Credit Counseling Service and the Texas Lyceum Association.

Hunter won his seventh nonconsecutive term in the 83rd Texas Legislature in 2012 without primary or general election opposition.

Role in post-2020 gerrymander 
In 2021, Hunter rushed through a heavily pro-Republican gerrymandered redistricting map that he authored through his committee. He provided a minimum of 24 hours advance notice for testimony and allowed for no amendments. The map vastly expanded the number of safe Republican seats, and diluted the power of non-white voters. The map increased the number of seats where white are in the majority and reduced the number of seats where Hispanics or blacks are in the majority, even though non-whites were behind 95% of the population growth in Texas.

References

External links

State Representative Todd Hunter official Texas House of Representatives site
Campaign Website
Texas Tribune Directory

 (unseated by Juan M. Garcia, III)

1953 births
Living people
People from Bartlesville, Oklahoma
People from Corpus Christi, Texas
Members of the Texas House of Representatives
Texas Democrats
Texas Republicans
Texas lawyers
American Episcopalians
University of Kansas alumni
Dedman School of Law alumni
21st-century American politicians